Demon Hunter is the debut album by American metalcore band Demon Hunter, released through Solid State in 2002.

Recording
The album was recorded in Drop C tuning. All of Demon Hunter's subsequent releases would be dropped even lower to Drop B. Industrial vocal elements are also featured in various songs.

Touring and promotion
The band joined Extol on tour in the summer of 2003.

Demon Hunter's first single, "Infected," had a music video which debuted on MTV2's Extreme Rock and found considerable airplay on Fuse TV's Uranium. The intense video revolves around two subjects; one, vocalist Ryan Clark, is shown using an extravagant dagger to carve the word "HELP" into a tree in the pouring rain. The second subject is a white collared man at a desk who is overcome with extreme panic for ambiguous reasons. He finally falls to the floor after repeatedly typing "help" on his monitor. Given Demon Hunter's overt Christianity, the video could be seen as people reaching out for a savior in their time of desperation. "Infected" would later be featured on the compilation album MTV2 Headbangers Ball.

Album art and booklet
The band members are not credited in the album's liner notes. Clark explained this by citing the fact that Demon Hunter's members have been in previous groups and that they wanted the band to initially rely solely on its music. The Demon Hunter booklet features four 'chapters' of sorts. When asked about this, Clark responded:
"It was more an artwork based concept as opposed to a concept pertaining to the music. We wanted to give it an old world feel, with the book and everything. Just a way to make the artwork really come alive."

Reception

Demon Hunter received overall positive reviews. Allmusic's Alex Henderson described it as "an album in which moments of intense brutality are followed by hauntingly melodic passages." He commended the band for its "complementary" use of intensity and melody and noted the album as "imperfect" yet "interesting." Such comments have been echoed in other small-form media reviews. Demon Hunter has stylistically been compared to Slipknot, particularly in the vocals department, as well as more intense nu metal groups.

Track listing

Personnel

Band members
 Ryan Clark – lead vocals, guitars
 Don Clark – bass guitar
 Jesse Sprinkle – drums, percussion

Production
 Aaron Mlasko – drum technician
 Brandon Ebel – executive producer
 Aaron Sprinkle – producer
 J.R. McNeely – mixing
 Kris McCaddon – photography
 Latif Tayour – mixing assistant
 Phil Peterson – strings
 Tim Harmon – drum engineering
 Troy Glessner – mastering
 Tyson Paoletti – A&R
 Josh Tillman – additional drums

References

External links
 Demon Hunter - "Infected" music video

Demon Hunter albums
2002 debut albums
Solid State Records albums
Albums produced by Aaron Sprinkle